The Athletics Federation of Moldova is the governing body for the sport of athletics in Moldova.

Affiliations 
 International Association of Athletics Federations (IAAF)
 European Athletic Association (EAA)
 National Olympic Committee of the Republic of Moldova

National records 
FAM maintains the Moldovan records in athletics.

External links 
 Official webpage 

Moldova
Athletics
National governing bodies for athletics